Hsinbo (also Sinbo) is a town on the Irrawaddy River in Myitkyina Township, Kachin State, Myanmar.

External links
 "Sinbo Map — Satellite Images of Sinbo" Maplandia

Populated places in Kachin State